Trumbull Mall (formerly known as Westfield Trumbull, Westfield Shoppingtown Trumbull, and Trumbull Shopping Park) is a shopping mall located in Trumbull, Connecticut. It was the first enclosed shopping mall in Connecticut upon opening in 1964. The mall was developed by the Frogue Corporation, and was the first U.S. acquisition by Australian mall operator Westfield Group in 1977. Ownership and management were transferred to the Westfield Corporation in 2014, and to Unibail-Rodamco-Westfield in 2018. It has  of gross leasable area. In early 2023, it was sold to Namdar Realty Group.

History
The Westfield Trumbull was originally known as the Trumbull Shopping Park and was built in 1964 by the Frouge Corporation, with a branch of the E. J. Korvette discount department store and D.M. Read as its two original anchor stores, as well as a Waldbaum's and Woolworth's. In 1977, it was purchased by The Westfield Group and became the first US mall purchased by the Australian mall operator. The first f.y.e. store opened at the mall in 1993.

Read's was converted into Jordan Marsh, another nameplate owned by parent company Allied Stores, in 1987. The merger of Allied and Federated Department Stores resulted in Jordan Marsh being converted into Abraham & Straus in April 1992, and later Abraham & Straus being converted into Macy's in April 1995. Trumbull Shopping Park was renamed Westfield Shoppingtown Trumbull in 1998.

The mall was renamed Westfield Trumbull with the company-wide discontinuation of the "Westfield Shoppingtown" naming convention in May 2005, citing that "the name served its purpose" and that "Shoppingtown is part of [their] heritage, but Westfield is the brand." With the acquisition of The May Company by Federated in July 2005, it was announced that the Federated-owned Macy's would vacate its previous location in the former Read's building and reopen in the outgoing May-owned Filene's building; the conversion was completed in 2006. The vacant Read's anchor spot was demolished in 2007; in its place, a two-floor Target store was constructed and opened in October 2008.

On August 27, 2020, Lord & Taylor announced they would shutter their brick-and-mortar fleet after modernizing into a digital collective department store. Early plans envision the 99,534-square-foot (9,247-square-meter) store reconstructed into a modern space known as York Factory, a co-working sub-brand offering soft amenities such as a program delivering lunch straight to your office, bike rentals, a physical and mental wellness studio, salon services, and weekly events. 

On September 7, 2020, an apartment complex named "The Residences at Main" was proposed, and would be built near the mall. On October 3, 2020, the project moved forward, but there was limited to no news after that. However, on October 15, 2021, construction would officially begin on the new project. 

On February 14, 2022, the parking garage located near the entrance of Target, JCPenney, and two of the mall entrances, one located next to SeaQuest, and the other near Michael Kors and Sunglass Hut, collapsed, causing it to be closed indefinitely. On October 23, 2022, construction to rebuild the parking garage began.

On January 3, 2023, Unibail-Rodamco-Westfield sold this mall along with Westfield South Shore in Bay Shore, New York for a combined deal of $196 million to Namdar Realty Group.

See also

 Hawley Lane Mall – another shopping mall in Trumbull, Connecticut

References

Buildings and structures in Trumbull, Connecticut
Shopping malls in Connecticut
Namdar Realty Group
Tourist attractions in Fairfield County, Connecticut
Shopping malls established in 1964
Shopping malls in the New York metropolitan area
1964 establishments in Connecticut